Events from the year 2005 in Macau, China.

Incumbents
 Chief Executive - Edmund Ho
 President of the Legislative Assembly - Susana Chou

Events

June
 1 June - The opening of Macau Tea Culture House in São Lázaro.

September
 25 September - 2005 Macanese legislative election.

October
 29 October - The start of 2005 East Asian Games.

November
 6 November - The end of 2005 East Asian Games.

December
 31 December - The start of trial operation of Macau Fisherman's Wharf.

References

 
Years of the 21st century in Macau
Macau
Macau
2000s in Macau